MS Spirit of Tasmania I is a roll-on/roll-off ferry operated by TT-Line between Melbourne and Devonport in Australia. Built in 1998 by Kvaerner Masa-Yards at Turku New Shipyard in Finland for Superfast Ferries as MS Superfast IV, since 2002 she has sailed for TT-Line as MS Spirit of Tasmania I.

Concept and construction
The Superfast IV was the second ship of the second pair (the former pair being Superfast I and Superfast II) built for Superfast Ferries at Kvaerner Masa-Yards for its Adriatic Sea services from Patras to Ancona She was a sister ship of Superfast III.

Amenities and deck layout
Spirit of Tasmania I has 11 decks, with 222 cabins.

Decks 1 to 6 are used to hold cars and trucks.  The fore-ends of Decks 1 and 2 are accessed via a ramp from deck 3 (The aft-end space of the two decks houses the ships machinery). Deck 6 holds cars using a hoistable platform.
Deck 7 has cabins, a reception area, small movie theater, lounge bar, gaming lounge, gift shop, tourism bureau, main bar, two restaurants and a children's playroom.
Deck 8 has cabins and an ocean recliner area.
Deck 9 is mainly crew area.
Deck 10 has a bar and disco area.
Deck 11 has a helicopter landing pad.

Service history

1998–2002: Superfast IV
The Superfast IV entered service on 1 April 1998 on Superfast Ferries' Patras to Ancona service. In March 2002 the Superfast IV was sold to TT-Line.

2002 Onwards: Spirit of Tasmania I
TT-Line took over its new ship on 10 May of the same year, she along with her sister were handed over to TT-Line at Patras. The two ships then sailed to the Neorion ship yard on the island of Syros for painting and general overhaul and renamed Spirit of Tasmania I. She subsequently sailed to Hobart, Tasmania, where she was refitted for her new service. On 1 September 2002 she entered service on TT-Line's Melbourne to Devonport service. In 2015 she was refurbished in Devonport.

2005 event
During the night of 3 to 4 February 2005 Spirit of Tasmania I ran into heavy seas in the Bass Strait while sailing from Melbourne to Devonport. At approximately 02:00 the seas reached a height of 20 metres. The seas smashed cabin windows on the starboard bow and subsequently cabin walls were smashed down, flooding cabin decks as high as deck 9 (the deck under the bridge). Many passengers were unaware of the cause of water in their cabins as the water disabled the public announcement system. The captain decided it best to return to Melbourne, arriving mid morning to heavy media coverage. The ship remained in port overnight for temporary repairs and sailed again the following evening for Devonport.

References

External links

Spirit of Tasmania I – Ferries of Tasmania

Bass Strait ferries
Ferries of Australia
Ships built in Turku
Superfast III-class fast ropax ferries
1998 ships